FIBA AmeriCup records are the records that have been attained at the FIBA AmeriCup tournament.

Most Valuable Players

All-Tournament Teams

Top scorer by tournament

Average

Top 10 cumulative points scorers

Top scorers in a single game

Players with the most tournaments and games played

Top medalists

Players with the most total medals won

References

External links
FIBA Americas official website

Records
Basketball statistics